Tom and Jerry: Willy Wonka and the Chocolate Factory is a 2017 American animated direct-to-video musical comedy film starring the cat-and-mouse duo Tom and Jerry. Produced by Warner Bros. Animation and Turner Entertainment Co., it is the first Tom and Jerry direct-to-video film to be distributed by Warner Bros. Home Entertainment internationally and is also the final Tom and Jerry direct-to-video film to be involved with Warner Bros. Animation's founder Hal Geer, who died on January 26, 2017. The film is an animated adaptation of the 1971 film Willy Wonka & the Chocolate Factory (which in turn is based on the 1964 book Charlie and the Chocolate Factory by Roald Dahl) with the addition of Tom and Jerry as characters and seen through their point of view.

The film was released via digital media on June 27, 2017, and released on home media on July 11, 2017. It was panned by critics, who found Tom and Jerry's inclusion in the story to be forced and unnecessary.

Plot 

Tom and Jerry chase each other all over town while searching for food until Jerry disappears with a group of children who go to Bill's Candy Shop. The shop owner gives the children free candy while Tom and Jerry continue their antics in the shop.

Charlie Bucket, a poor paperboy, stops Tom from eating Jerry and befriends them by offering them a loaf of bread. While Charlie rushes home to his widowed mother and bedridden grandparents, Tom and Jerry steal a box of Wonka Bars from the shop. Grandpa Joe reveals to Charlie that Willy Wonka locked his famous chocolate factory because other candy makers, including rival Arthur Slugworth, sent in spies to steal his recipes. Wonka disappeared, but for three years resumed selling candy; the origin of Wonka's labor force is unknown. Tom and Jerry arrive at Charlie's home with the box of Wonka Bars, but Charlie convinces the two that stealing is wrong and they should return the box.

The next day, Wonka announces that he hid five Golden Tickets in five Wonka Bars. Finders of the tickets will receive a factory tour and a lifetime supply of chocolate. Four of the tickets are found by gluttonous Augustus Gloop, spoiled Veruca Salt, chewing gum-addicted Violet Beauregard, and television-obsessed Mike TeeVee. As each winner is announced on television, a man whispers to them. Charlie opens one Wonka Bar, but finds no Golden Ticket and loses hope. The newspapers announce the fifth ticket was found by a millionaire in Paraguay named Alberto Minoleta.

Tom and Jerry earn a dollar coin by recycling milk bottles, but lose it in a gutter after fighting over it. Charlie finds the coin and uses it to buy a Wonka Bar for Grandpa Joe. The television news reveals that Minoleta has been arrested for forging his ticket. Charlie opens the Wonka Bar and finds the fifth Golden Ticket. While rushing home, he is confronted by the same man seen whispering to the other winners, who introduces himself as Slugworth and offers to pay for a sample of Wonka's latest creation, the Everlasting Gobstopper. Charlie returns home with the Golden Ticket and chooses Grandpa Joe as his chaperone. The next day, Tom and Jerry rush to the factory with the Golden Ticket that Grandpa Joe forgot. Once the children enter the factory, the movie plays in the same order of the source material with the occasional interjection of Tom and Jerry interacting with the factory.

Once only Charlie and Grandpa Joe remain, Wonka dismisses them without the promised chocolate. A small Oompa-Loompa intern named Tuffy warns Charlie that Slugworth and Spike have stolen a Gobstopper and are on their way out of the factory. Following a fight in the Wonkavision Room, Charlie stops Slugworth. After this, Charlie and Grandpa Joe confront Wonka on the end of the tour. Wonka coldly explains that they violated the contract by stealing Fizzy Lifting Drinks and allowing Tom and Jerry into the factory and therefore receive nothing. Infuriated at this, Grandpa Joe attempts to protest but Wonka angrily demands them all to leave at once. Grandpa Joe then furiously suggests to Charlie that he should give Slugworth the Gobstopper, but Charlie returns the candy to Wonka. Because of this, Wonka declares Charlie the winner. He reveals that Slugworth is really "Mr. Wilkinson", an employee of his, and the offer to buy the Gobstopper was a morality test which only Charlie passed.

The trio and Tuffy (now an official Oompa-Loompa) enter the "Wonkavator", a multi-directional glass elevator that flies out of the factory. Tom and Jerry shrink Wilkinson and Spike for the troubles they put them through the day and use Fizzy Lifting Drinks to catch up with the others. Soaring over the city, Wonka reveals that his actual prize is the factory; Wonka created the contest to find a worthy heir and Charlie and his family can immediately move in, including Tom and Jerry.

Voice cast

 Spike Brandt as Tom, Jerry (both uncredited) and Spike
 JP Karliak as Willy Wonka
 Jess Harnell as Grandpa Joe, Bill the Candy Shop owner and Sam Beauregarde
 Lincoln Melcher as Charlie Bucket
 Mick Wingert as Mr. Slugworth / Mr. Wilkinson
 Lori Alan as Mrs. Teavee
 Jeff Bergman as Alberto Minoleta, American Reporter
 Rachel Butera as Augustus Gloop, Winkelmann
 Kate Higgins as Mrs. Bucket
 Dallas Lovato as Violet Beauregarde
 Emily O'Brien as Veruca Salt
 Sean Schemmel as Mr. Salt, Mr. Turkentine
 Kath Soucie as Tuffy
 Jim Ward as Anchorman, German Reporter
 Audrey Wasilewski as Mrs. Gloop
 Lauren Weisman as Mike Teavee

Reception
The trailer for Tom and Jerry: Willy Wonka and the Chocolate Factory was released in April 2017 and was met with a negative reception, with some critics questioning why the film was made. Ryan Scott of MovieWeb reacted to the trailer by describing it as "just the latest in a long line of these uncalled for mashups."

In a review of the film, Beth Elderkin of Gizmodo wrote: "Tom and Jerry: Willy Wonka and the Chocolate Factory is not just stupid, it's insulting. It's a cheap mockbuster with a cat and mouse artlessly, needlessly inserted."

References

External links

 

Charlie and the Chocolate Factory
Willy Wonka
2017 animated films
2017 films
2017 direct-to-video films
2010s fantasy comedy films
2010s children's comedy films
2010s musical comedy films
2010s American animated films
American children's animated comedy films
American children's animated fantasy films
American children's animated musical films
American fantasy adventure films
American fantasy comedy films
American musical comedy films
American musical fantasy films
Animated films based on children's books
Animated films based on novels
Animated crossover films
Animated films about children
Films about chocolate
Films based on British novels
Films based on works by Roald Dahl
Films directed by Spike Brandt
Films scored by Michael Tavera
Films set in factories
Tom and Jerry films
Warner Bros. Animation animated films
Warner Bros. direct-to-video animated films
2010s musical fantasy films
2017 comedy films
2010s children's animated films
2010s English-language films